The Siegmund and Marilyn Goldman House is listed in the National Register of Historic Places in Orange County, Florida. It is located in the city of Maitland, an Orlando suburb, and was designed in 1964 by architect Nils M. Schweizer.
It is a mid-century modern building inspired by designs of Frank Lloyd Wright.

References

National Register of Historic Places in Orange County, Florida
Houses in Orange County, Florida
Houses on the National Register of Historic Places in Florida
1964 establishments in Florida
Mid-century modern